Maye Musk (née Haldeman; born April 19, 1948) is a model and dietitian. She has been a model for 50 years, appearing on the covers of magazines, including a Time magazine health edition, Women's Day, international editions of Vogue, and Sports Illustrated Swimsuit Issue. The mother of Elon Musk, Kimbal Musk, and Tosca Musk, she holds Canadian, South African, and American citizenship.

Early life and career
Maye Haldeman was born on April 19, 1948, in Regina, Saskatchewan, Canada, a twin and one of five children. Her family moved to Pretoria, South Africa, in 1950. Her parents, Winnifred Josephine "Wyn" (Fletcher) and Dr. Joshua Norman Haldeman, a former director of Technocracy Incorporated, a former Regina chiropractor and amateur archaeologist, were adventurous and flew the family around the world in a prop plane in 1952. For over ten years, the family spent time roaming the Kalahari desert in search of its fabled Lost City of the Kalahari. Their parents gave slide shows and talks about their journeys. "My parents were very famous, but they were never snobs," she said.

As a young woman, Haldeman was a finalist in the 1969 Miss South Africa beauty competition. In 1970, she married Errol Musk (born May 2, 1946), a South African engineer she met in high school. They had three children: Elon Musk, Kimbal Musk, and Tosca Musk.  She named Elon after her American grandfather, John Elon Haldeman (born in Illinois).  Maye earned a master's degree in dietetics from the University of the Orange Free State in South Africa. She later earned another master's degree in nutritional science from the University of Toronto.

In 1979, she divorced Errol Musk. Two years later, Elon decided to live with his father. Kimbal joined Elon four years later. After graduating from high school, Elon decided to move to Canada; in 1989, six months later, Maye moved to Canada with her daughter Tosca. She is bilingual speaking Afrikaans and English.

Later life

Her modelling career continued in Canada and the United States. She has appeared on boxes of Special K cereal, in Revlon ads, and in a Beyoncé video ("Haunted"). She appeared nude on the cover of Time magazine for a health issue and also nude on the cover of New York magazine in 2011 with a fake pregnant belly. She was on the cover of Elle Canada in 2012, and starred in advertisement campaigns for Target and Virgin America. In September 2017, she became CoverGirl's oldest spokesmodel at age 69, which one news story reported as "making history". In 2022, at age 74, she was the oldest Sports Illustrated swimsuit model to date, appearing on the cover of the annual issue.

In addition to modelling, she has a business as a dietitian and gives presentations worldwide.

She wrote a memoir titled A Woman Makes a Plan: Advice for a Lifetime of Adventure, Beauty, and Success (2019).

In 2021, she was one of the guests at Lady Kitty Spencer's wedding.

Maye Musk appeared alongside her son Elon on Saturday Night Live on May 8, 2021, the day before Mother's Day.

References

External links

1948 births
South African female models
Canadian female models
People from Regina, Saskatchewan
Dietitians
Living people
University of the Free State alumni
Canadian twins
University of Toronto alumni
People from Pretoria
IMG Models models
South African people of Canadian descent
Canadian emigrants to South Africa
Musk family